Vinyltriethoxysilane is an organosilicon compound with the formula (C2H5O)3SiCH=CH2.  It is a colorless liquid.  The compound is bifunctional, featuring both a vinyl group and hydrolytically sensitive ethoxysilyl groups.  As such it is a crosslinking agent.

Applications
Vinyltriethoxysilane and the related vinyltrimethoxysilane are using as monomers and comonomer for polymers such as ethylene-vinyltrimethoxysilane and ethylene-vinyl acetate-vinyltrimethoxysilane. Vinyltrialkoxysilanes are also used as cross-linking agents during the manufacture of cross-linked polyethylene (PEX). The alkoxysilane moiety is reactive toward water, and in the presence of moisture, it forms silicon-oxygen-silicon bonds that cross-link the material to cure it. Moisture-curable polymers are used as electrical insulation in some kinds of cables and for water pipe in under-floor heating installations.

Vinyltrialkoxysilanes are also used as a coupling agents or adhesion promoters for treatment of glass fibers and particulate minerals in order to form stronger bonds with resin and produce fiberglass with better mechanical properties. Amino-functional silanes such as (3-aminopropyl)triethoxysilane and epoxy-functional silanes are used for the same purpose. The silane group attaches to the glass substrate via covalent Si-O-Si bond, while the resin reacts with the vinyl-, amino-, or epoxy- group and binds to it.

References

Silyl ethers
Monomers
Vinyl compounds
Ethoxides